Javaran Rural District is a rural district (dehestan) in Hanza District, Rabor County, Kerman Province, Iran. At the 2006 census, its population was 5,068, in 1,218 families. The rural district has 49 villages.

References 

Rural Districts of Kerman Province
Rabor County